Taylorsville is an unincorporated community in Wilson County, in the U.S. state of Tennessee.

History
Taylorsville was platted in 1840, and named for John N. Taylor, the original owner of the town site.

References

Unincorporated communities in Wilson County, Tennessee
Unincorporated communities in Tennessee